Loreto College is an all-girls public secondary school in Rivervalley, Swords, County Dublin, Ireland. The school was opened in 1837 and was situated at 41 - 46 North Great George's Street but moved to Swords in 1988. It is connected with the international group of schools served by the Sisters of Loreto.

Notable alumni
 Marie Kean
 Sylvia Meehan
 Moyra Barry
 Helena Concannon
 Mary Wallace

References

Girls' schools in the Republic of Ireland
Secondary schools in County Dublin
Educational institutions established in 1988
1988 establishments in Ireland